Huang Cong (born 6 January 1997) is a Chinese footballer currently playing as a midfielder for Shandong Taishan.

Club career
Huang Cong would go abroad to further his football development and joined Slovak club AS Trenčín where he would be included in their senior team for the 2016–17 Slovak First Football League season. A move to Portugal would see him play for the Gondomar youth team and then Gondomar B, their reserve team allowed to participate within the Portuguese football pyramid. He would make his debut for them in a league game on 26 August 2018 against Baião in a 1-1 draw.

On 28 February 2019, Huang would return to China to play for top tier club Shandong Luneng (now renamed Shandong Taishan) for the 2019 Chinese Super League campaign. He would make his debut for the club in a Chinese FA Cup game on 1 May 2019 against Zhejiang Energy Greentown F.C. that ended in a 2-1 victory. This would be followed by his first league appearance on 17 October 2020 against Beijing Guoan in a 2-2 draw. He would go on to be a squad player within the team as the club won the 2020 Chinese FA Cup. He would gradually establish himself as a squad regular within the club and was part of the squad that won the 2021 Chinese Super League title.

Career statistics
.

Honours

Club
Shandong Luneng/ Shandong Taishan
Chinese Super League: 2021
Chinese FA Cup: 2020, 2021, 2022.

References

External links

1997 births
Living people
Chinese footballers
China youth international footballers
Chinese expatriate footballers
Association football midfielders
Chinese Super League players
Gondomar S.C. players
AS Trenčín players
Leixões S.C. players
Shandong Taishan F.C. players
Chinese expatriate sportspeople in Portugal
Expatriate footballers in Portugal
Chinese expatriate sportspeople in Slovakia
Expatriate footballers in Slovakia
Footballers from Wuhan